Acaronia is a small genus of cichlids found in the Amazon, Orinoco and other basins in northern South America.

Species
There are currently two recognized species in this genus:
 Acaronia nassa (Heckel, 1840) (Bigeye cichlid)
 Acaronia vultuosa S. O. Kullander, 1989

References

External links
 

Cichlasomatini
Cichlid genera
Taxa named by George S. Myers